The States can refer to:

United States
The Estates, a representative assembly in many (feudal) historical countries
The States Assembly, the legislative body of Jersey
The States General, the legislative body of the Netherlands
The States of Guernsey, the government and legislature of Guernsey
The States (TV series), 2007 documentary television series

See also
State (disambiguation)